The Lunar Precursor Robotic Program (LPRP) is a NASA program that uses robotic spacecraft to prepare for future crewed missions to the Moon. The program gathers data such as lunar radiation, surface imaging, areas of scientific interest, temperature and lighting conditions, and potential resource identification.  

Two LPRP missions, the Lunar Reconnaissance Orbiter (LRO) and the Lunar Crater Observation and Sensing Satellite (LCROSS), were launched in June 2009. The lift-off above Cape Canaveral Air Force Station in Florida on June 18, 2009, was successful. The uncrewed Atlas V rocket launched the two space probes towards the Moon, where they will provide a 3D map and search for water in conjunction with the Hubble Space Telescope. The launch date, originally planned for October 2008, was moved to June 17, 2009, due to a postponement of the June 13, 2009 launch of the Space Shuttle Endeavour because a hydrogen fuel leak. This lunar program marked the first United States mission to the Moon in over ten years. Neil Armstrong's first step on the Moon occurred on July 20, 1969, and this launch was 32 days before its 40th anniversary. The actual journey to the Moon took about four days. The LRO entered a low orbit around the Moon, while the LCROSS mission performed a "swing-by" and entered a different orbit to set up a collision with the Moon's surface several months later. The projected lunar impact of the  Centaur and LCROSS spacecraft was on October 9, 2009, at 11:30 UT (7:30 a.m. EDT, 4:30 a.m. PDT), ± 30 minutes.

Program history 

Initially, the LPRP program was a part of the Science Mission Directorate of NASA (SMD) and was called the Robotic Lunar Exploration Program (RLEP). Management of the RLEP program was assigned to Goddard Space Flight Center (GSFC) in February 2004. At that time, the Program's goal was to "...initiate a series of robotic missions to the Moon to prepare for and support future human exploration activities." 

In 2005, responsibility for RLEP was moved to NASA's Exploration Systems Mission Directorate (ESMD) and management was assigned to the Ames Research Center (ARC). In 2006, the program was renamed the Lunar Precursor Robotic Program and management responsibility was reassigned to the Marshall Space Flight Center (MSFC). The US$583 million space mission comes equipped with a $504 million  LRO space probe and a $79 million LCROSS satellite.

LRO 

The Lunar Reconnaissance Orbiter (LRO) is the first mission of the LPRP program. Management of the LRO was assigned to Goddard Space Flight Center (GSFC) in 2004. The LRO launched on an Atlas V 401 rocket from Cape Canaveral Air Force Station on June 18, 2009, at 5:32 p.m. EDT (2132 GMT). The planned liftoff at 5:12 p.m. EDT (2112 GMT) was delayed by 20 minutes due to thunderstorms. The LRO was scheduled to orbit the moon for one year, gathering high-resolution images of the lunar surface that would allow the creation of detailed maps. The LRO's goals included finding safe landing sites for human visits to the Moon, identifying lunar resources, studying the lunar radiation environment, and providing a 3D map of the Moon's surface to allow astronauts to return to the moon by 2020. The LRO carried seven main instruments, including the Cosmic Ray Telescope for the Effects of Radiation (CRaTER), the Diviner Lunar Radiometer Experiment (DLRE), the Lyman-Alpha Mapping Project (LAMP), the Lunar Exploration Neutron Detector (LEND), the Lunar Orbiter Laser Altimeter (LOLA), the Lunar Reconnaissance Orbiter Camera (LROC), and the Miniature Radio Frequency radar (Mini-RF).

LCROSS 

The Lunar Crater Observation and Sensing Satellite (LCROSS) mission is to be launched with the LRO. It was selected as a secondary payload in 2006, and management of the program was assigned to Ames Research Center (ARC). The mission will explore a permanently shadowed region of a lunar pole by crashing the  spent Centaur rocket upper stage of the Atlas V launch vehicle into a dark crater. The composition of the ejecta plume will be observed by a shepherding spacecraft, which will itself crash-land 4 minutes later, creating a second plume. NASA expects the impact velocity will be over 9,000 km/h (5,600 mph). The ejecta plume will weigh in the order of 350 tons (317 metric tons) and rise  from the surface.

LADEE

The Lunar Atmosphere and Dust Environment Explorer (LADEE) launched on September 7, 2013. LADEE studied the lunar exosphere and dust in the Moon's vicinity.

Future projects
For a hypothetical International Lunar Network, NASA and international partners planned to land two stations on the lunar surface. Their objective was to establish a robotic set of geophysical monitoring stations on the surface and, eventually, in lunar orbit as well.

Data processing
The Lunar Mapping and Modeling project is using the obtained data to develop detailed topographic maps of the lunar surface that support lunar science, exploration, commercial, educational, and public outreach activities. In addition, solar radiation levels will be mapped and modelled. These integrated data will be used by NASA to make decisions about, for example, lunar outpost designs.

See also
 Exploration of the Moon
 List of future lunar missions
 Lunar ice
 Mars Reconnaissance Orbiter

References

External links

 Official home page
 Lunar Reconnaissance Orbiter Acquisition Program

Missions to the Moon
NASA programs
Exploration of the Moon